Ganna Ielisavetska is a paralympic swimmer from Ukraine competing mainly in category S2 events.

Ganna competed as part of the Ukrainian team in the 2008 Summer Paralympics.  She competed in the only event for her disability classification the  backstroke winning the gold medal in a new world-record time ahead of teammate Iryna Sotska and S1 class world record breaker Sara Carracelas García of Spain.

References

External links
 

Paralympic swimmers of Ukraine
Ukrainian female backstroke swimmers
Swimmers at the 2008 Summer Paralympics
Paralympic gold medalists for Ukraine
Paralympic silver medalists for Ukraine
Ukrainian female freestyle swimmers
Living people
Swimmers at the 2012 Summer Paralympics
Medalists at the 2008 Summer Paralympics
Medalists at the 2012 Summer Paralympics
Year of birth missing (living people)
Medalists at the World Para Swimming Championships
Medalists at the World Para Swimming European Championships
Paralympic medalists in swimming
S2-classified Paralympic swimmers
21st-century Ukrainian women